Coleophora ribasella is a moth of the family Coleophoridae. It is found in France and Spain.

The larvae feed on Artemisia campestris. They create a very slender tubular silken case.

References

Ribasella
Moths described in 1982
Moths of Europe